Crime Pays is a vintage collection of Willie Colón's early lounge recordings from the late 1960s and early 1970s mainly with Héctor Lavoe, including Guajirón, El Titán, Que Lío and Eso Se Baila Así.

Track listing
 "Che Che Colé" Colón - 3:30
 "El Malo" Colón - 3:55
 "Guisando" Colón, Lavoe - 4:00
 "Jazzy" Colón - 4:00
 "Juana Peña" Colón, Lavoe - 5:37
 "Guajirón" Dimond - 5:59
 "El Titán" Colón, Lavoe - 5:21
 "Que Lío" Colón, Joe Cuba, Lavoe - 4:35
 "Eso Se Baila Así" Colón - 5:15

Personnel
Len Bauman: photography
Jon Child: liner notes
Willie Colón: trombone, vocals
Héctor Lavoe: vocals
Jerry Masucci: producer
Johnny Pacheco: recording director
Izzy Sanabria: design

References

Willie Colón albums
1972 compilation albums
Collaborative albums